Chowning is a surname.  It may refer to:

People
 Ann Chowning (1929–2016), American anthropologist in West New Britain and other areas of the Pacific  
 James Chowning Davies (born 1918), American sociologist
 John Chowning (born 1934), American inventor and musician 
 Randall Chowning, American musician, member of the band Ozark Mountain Daredevils 
 Trevor Chowning, American pop artist and former talent manager 
 Wayne A. Chowning, first mayor of DeSoto, Texas in the United States 
 Josiah Chowning, Proprietor of Chowning's Tavern in colonial America

Places
 Chowning Cemetery in Fairbanks Township, Sullivan County, Indiana in the United States

See also
 Chown (surname)